São Tomé and Príncipe will be competing at the 2020 Summer Paralympics in Tokyo, Japan, from 24 August to 5 September 2021.

Athletics 

Track

See also
 São Tomé and Príncipe at the 2020 Summer Olympics

References

Nations at the 2020 Summer Paralympics
2021 in São Tomé and Príncipe
2020
Sport in São Tomé and Príncipe